The Philadelphia Blazers were an ice hockey franchise in the World Hockey Association (WHA) for the 1972–73 WHA season based in Philadelphia. The team's home ice was the Philadelphia Convention Hall and Civic Center.

The franchise was originally intended to be based in Miami, Florida, and called the Screaming Eagles, but due to money problems and a lack of a suitable arena, the franchise instead moved to Philadelphia.  After only one season in Philadelphia, the team relocated to Vancouver for the start of the 1973–74 WHA season and became the Vancouver Blazers. Two years later the franchise moved again, this time to Calgary where it was called the Calgary Cowboys. In 1977, the franchise folded.

Composition of the roster
In June 1972, businessmen Bernard Brown and James Cooper were granted the rights to the Miami Screaming Eagles, along with the players (including Bernie Parent) whom were under contract with the team, from businessman Herb Martin. Brown and Cooper then moved the franchise to Philadelphia and renamed it the Blazers. They also signed Derek Sanderson to a five year contract for $2.6 million over which, at the time, was the highest salary ever paid to a professional sports player. The signing produced a great deal of publicity, but it was controversial as well, since many hockey pundits felt that Sanderson's prior career and ability did not warrant such a salary.

Regular season
The Blazers had high hopes going into the inaugural WHA season with such stars as Parent, Sanderson and John McKenzie, who was named the team's player-coach. But their hopes were soon dashed as McKenzie suffered an injury in a pre-season game and Parent and Sanderson also suffered from injuries.  McKenzie was soon replaced as coach by Phil Watson. The team's first home game on Friday, October 13, 1972 was also a disaster.  When the Zamboni drove onto the playing surface after arriving late at the arena, the improperly made ice could not support its weight and it cracked open, forcing the game to be rescheduled.  

The team lost 16 of its first 20 games before Parent and McKenzie returned.  During this time McKenzie was replaced as coach by Phil Watson.  Also, Sanderson left the team; after only eight games (in which he scored three goals and three assists) and considerable controversy, the owners paid him a much smaller sum--$500,000--to void the remainder of his contract, and he returned to the Bruins.

Playoffs

The Blazers improved as the season went on. Andre Lacroix led the league in scoring, and Danny Lawson scored 61 goals; they would prove to be two of the WHA's brightest stars, and Lacroix became the league's all-time leading career scorer.  Coupled with Bernie Parent's goaltending, the team made the playoffs with a record of 38 wins and 40 losses.  However, Parent left the team after the first game of the playoffs (a 3-2 loss to the Cleveland Crusaders), leaving netminding duties in the hands of backup Marcel Paille, who had not played in the NHL for almost eight years and was then over 40 years old, and 20 year old Yves Archambault whose total experience above juniors was 30 games in the Eastern Hockey League.   The Blazers were quickly swept, lasting only the minimum four games.  Parent's agent, Howard J. Casper, claimed that money deposited into an escrow account to guarantee his full multi-year contract had been withdrawn by the team and that Parent would not return until the money was repaid; he also alleged that Parent was having trouble getting his regular salary and that the team was not paying medical expenses for him. Parent never rejoined the Blazers but returned to the Philadelphia Flyers the following season.

Relocation

Despite making a decent account of themselves on the ice, the Blazers were no match at the box office for the Philadelphia Flyers of the established National Hockey League, who played at the then-state-of-the-art Spectrum. While competing with an NHL team would likely have been difficult in the best of circumstances, for the Blazers matters were made worse since their debut coincided with the Flyers becoming competitive on the ice, posting their first winning record before ultimately winning consecutive Stanley Cups in the two following seasons. With no reasonable hope of the Blazers overcoming poor attendance at the Civic Center, which averaged less than 50% of capacity, Brown and Cooper sold the Blazers to Jim Pattison after only one season. Pattison moved the team to Vancouver.

The last active Philadelphia Blazer player in major professional hockey was Dave Hutchinson who retired in 1983-84 NHL season. The last active Philadelphia Blazer was Ron Plumb who played in England until 1986.

Season-by-season record
See 1972–73 Philadelphia Blazers season

Note: GP = Games played, W = Wins, L = Losses, T = Ties, Pts = Points, GF = Goals for, GA = Goals against, PIM = Penalties in minutes

See also
 Calgary Cowboys (WHA)
 Miami Screaming Eagles
 Vancouver Blazers
 List of WHA seasons

References

Calgary Cowboys
Philadelphia Blazers
Unofficial Home of the Philadelphia Blazers
The Internet Hockey Database: Philadelphia Blazers
Apr 5, 1973 Dennis Hextall vs Ross Lonsberry Minnesota North Stars vs Philadelphia Flyers
Legends of Hockey—NHL Player Search—Players By Team—Philadelphia Blazers
Civic Center, Philadelphia
Ice Hockey (Professional)
Philadelphia Blazers (1972/73)

World Hockey Association teams
Defunct ice hockey teams in Pennsylvania
Blazers
Ice hockey teams in Philadelphia
Ice hockey clubs established in 1972
Ice hockey clubs disestablished in 1973
1972 establishments in Pennsylvania
1973 disestablishments in Pennsylvania